Wandavasi Dorakanti Balaji Rao (born 4 March 1978) is an Indian cricketer who has played one One Day International and four Twenty20 Internationals for Canada. He also played for India in the U-19 level.

Personal life
Balaji currently resides in the Scarborough district of Toronto, Ontario.  He plays for the Centurions Cricket Club, a large cricket organization in Toronto.

Controversies
On 3 March 2011, in the 2011 Cricket World Cup match between Canada and Pakistan, following an aggressive exchange between Pakistani bowler Umar Gul, Rao, who was batting, lashed out with Hindi slurs after Pakistani fielder Ahmed Shehzad appeared to provoke the batsman.

References

External links

1978 births
Living people
Canada One Day International cricketers
Canada Twenty20 International cricketers
Canadian cricketers
Indian cricketers
Railways cricketers
Telugu people
Indian emigrants to Canada
Cricketers at the 2011 Cricket World Cup
Tamil Nadu cricketers
South Zone cricketers
Cricketers from Chennai